Herbert Mertin (born 29 April 1958) is a German politician for the FDP and since 2016 minister for justice in the federal state of Rhineland-Palatinate.

Life and politics
Mertin was born in 1958 in the Chilean city of Temuco and remigrated in 1971 to Germany. 

Mertin became minister for justice in the State Government of Rhineland-Palatinate in 1999 until 2006 and again since 2016 under Minister-President Malu Dreyer.

References

1958 births
Living people
People from Temuco
21st-century German politicians